The list of shipwrecks in June 1834 includes ships sunk, foundered, wrecked, grounded or otherwise lost during June 1834.

1 June

3 June

5 June

6 June

7 June

10 June

13 June

14 June

15 June

19 June

20 June

23 June

26 June

Unknown date

References

1834-06